Huang Yu-chun (born 16 November 1939 in Shantou, Republic of China), known by her final stage name Ivy Ling Po, is a retired Hong Kong actress and Chinese opera singer. She is best known for a number of mega-hit Huangmei opera films in the 1960s, especially The Love Eterne (1963) which made her an Asian superstar overnight. She played an important role in the entertainment industry for preserving the Huangmei opera art form.

She has used many names in her past. When she was a young child, she was sold to a family in Xiamen (Amoy), where she took on the name Jun Haitang and worked as a domestic maid. After reaching preadolescence, her foster mother forced her to enter the Hong Kong movie industry to exploit her. She first acted in Amoy Hokkien films under the stage name Xiaojuan, later in Cantonese films under the stage name Shen Yan, before finally entering the Shaw Brothers Studio to act in Mandarin films as (Ivy) Ling Po and rising to superstardom.

Career

1950s – 1960s
Ivy Ling Po was born in Shantou, China and resided at Xiamen for a time before moving to Hong Kong.  Her first screen appearance was in the Ha-Yuen movie Love of Young People (1951) at the age of twelve under the name of Xiao Juan with the Amoy movie company. Besides appearing in more than 50 Hokkien movies, she also dubbed for other movie companies and particularly Huangmei Operas for Shaw Brothers. She was discovered by Li Han-hsiang while dubbing for the Shaw Brothers' opera Dream of the Red Chamber and cast as Liang Shanbo in The Love Eterne (Liang Shanbo yu Zhu Yingtai also known as Liang Zhu) in 1962 with Betty Loh Ti. The judges at the 2nd Golden Horse Awards were so impressed by her performance that they created a special award for her citing "Outstanding Performance". One year later, Ivy Ling Po took home the coveted title of Asian Movie Queen when she won the "Best Actress" award at the 11th Asian Film Festival for her superlative performance in Lady General Hua Mu-lan. She would add the "Most Versatile Talent" award to her collection when she won it at the 12th Asian Film Festival a year later for her role as a young prince in The Grand Substitution and a scholar in The Mermaid. She became the leading figure in the Huangmei Opera genre and was usually cast in male roles. Every year without fail, Ivy Ling Po would make the list of the Top Ten stars in Hong Kong in polls conducted by magazines and newspapers. Indeed, she was at no. 1 for many years in annual polls conducted by Cinemart magazine.

To avoid being type-cast, she tried successfully for various roles in wuxia and contemporary genres. On one of her contemporary outings, she picked up a Golden Horse Best Actress award playing the ill-fated wife of Kwan Shan in Too Late for Love.

1970s – 1980s
In 1975, a bit role as a neglected empress in Li Han-hsiang's "Empress Dowager" won her the "Best Supporting Actress" award. Despite her limited screen time in this sprawling epic, it is remarkable that she won this award despite tough competition. After her contract with Shaw Brothers Studio ended in 1975, she went on to act in other television series and films with her husband. A plum movie role in which she had to age from a teenager to an old woman in Father, Husband, Son won her another Golden Horse Best Actress award. Her last screen appearance was in the movie Golden Swallow (1987) playing an evil witch. She retired after that and emigrated with her family, Chin Han and three sons, to Toronto, Ontario, Canada in 1989.

2000s
Ivy Ling Po made a spectacular career resurgence in 2002 when she teamed up with another veteran Shaw actress Hu Chin to stage Butterfly Lovers. Two original cast members Li Kun & Jen Chieh were also on hand to recreate their respective roles. She toured extensively with this stage version of her signature movie bringing it to Malaysia, Singapore, Taiwan & United States. This stage musical was so successful that Ivy had to restage it two years later in Taiwan. A double DVD set was released in 2003 by Rock Records.

Since then, Ivy Ling Po has staged numerous concerts in Taiwan, USA and Malaysia. Her two concerts at Genting City Of Entertainment in Malaysia in 2005 were particularly memorable as she brought along her close friends Hu Chin, Chin Hsiang Lin & Yueh Hua to sing with her. Fans flew in from as far away as USA, Australia, Taiwan & Hong Kong to pay homage.

In 2006, Ivy Ling Po returned to the Hong Kong Coliseum as part of a large group of singers for the Everlasting Golden Hits concert. She sang her signature songs from The Love Eterne, even duetting with Lisa Wang who sang the part of Zhu Yingtai. In addition, she thrilled audiences with her definitive version of Jiao Dao from The Crimson Palm and claimed her song back from cover versions sung over the years by Tsin Ting, Jenny Tseng and Yao Su Rung.

Many in the audience went specially to see her despite the presence of other top singers like Frances Yip, Eliza Chan, Susanna Kwan, Wah Wa (sister of Liu Yun), Sandra Lang, Kenny Bee, Johnny Yip & Adam Cheng. A 3-CD set has been released in HK by Kinston Entertainment & a DVD/VCD release followed a few months later.

With many of her Shaw movies being re-released by Celestial, Ivy Ling Po has become a hot star again. She was in the first batch of Hong Kong celebrities who were invited to open the Avenue of Stars in April 2004 in Tsim Sha Tsui. Her handprints and signature are now prominently displayed there affirming her status as one of the greats of the Hong Kong film industry.

In January 2006, Ivy Ling Po was awarded the WIFTI-HK Professional Achievement Award with the re-release and screening of the remastered The 14 Amazons at Hong Kong Visual Arts Centre. Ivy received the award from Dr Charles Wang, director of Salon Film (HK) Ltd.

In April 2006, Ivy Ling Po and Chin Han appeared on prime-time TVB for an interview. Ivy also promoted the CD release of Everlasting Golden Hits concert whilst in HK.

On 8 April 2006, the couple attended the 25th Hong Kong Film Awards with son Kenneth Bi and daughter-in-law Rosa Li. To their delight as parents, they witnessed him receive the "Best New Director" award for his work on Rice Rhapsody, in which they also made a cameo appearance.

Indeed, 2006 promises to be a very good year as Ivy Ling Po and Chin Han celebrate 40 years of wedded bliss with ex-Shaw stars Chin Ping, Fang Yin, Chiao Chiao, Cheng Pei-pei, Helen Ma, Ching Li, Yueh Hua, Allyson Chang Yen, Lily Li, Ti Lung & Chen Hung Lieh.

In October 2006, Ivy Ling Po, Hu Chin and Xie Lei performed for adoring fans at Star City in Sydney, Australia. The response was so overwhelming that each of the 2 concerts lasted for close to 3 hours.

Ivy Ling Po was also the special guest star at the Frances Yip S.U.C.C.E.S.S concert held at the Queen Elizabeth Theatre in Vancouver on 30 October. Although she only sang 3 songs, it was sufficient to please her many fans who flocked to the concert from all over USA and Canada.

As 2006 draws to a close and IVL is preparing to release 2 more of her classic movies The Mirror & The Lichee (on 23 November 2006) & Duel for Gold (in Dec 2006) on DVD/VCD, Ivy Ling Po has found recognition and fame amongst the young movie lovers of today who appreciate good acting and charisma.

The Love Eterne legacy
Two Huangmei Opera movies, The Love Eterne and another titled Hung Niang were filmed in tandem in 1962. Filming commenced first on Hung Niang with Margaret Tu Chuan in the title role.  At the same time, Li Han-Hsiang was looking around for a fresh face to cast the main male character for The Love Eterne which was due to begin filming. He made the momentous decision to cast Ivy Ling Po in the role instead of a male actor. Due to competition with Cathay who was filming Butterfly Lovers at the time, Shaw Brothers pushed for a quicker completion of The Love Eterne. When it became a box office hit, the decision was taken to completely destroy the film Hung Niang in which Ling Po acted in a female role, as it was feared the release of the film would detract her popularity as a male impersonator. Although the Cathay version starred two movie queens Teresa Li Li-hua and Lucilla Yu Ming, the Shaw version which was released 20 months earlier completely overshadowed it and Ivy Ling Po became a household name. When she went to Taipei to promote the movie, she was mobbed by thousands at the airport and who lined the streets. Everywhere she went, they yelled Brother Liang, a nickname that has stuck to this day. Some fans even threw the real gold to her.  Tai Pei was named "Crazy City" because her fans loved her crazily.  Some people saw The Love Eterne more than 50 or 100 times and Run Run Shaw issued a statement that these superfans were not to be charged for their tickets anymore.

Hung Niang was later remade in 1964 as West Chamber with Ling Po taking on the role of the scholar played by Chiao Chuang in the uncompleted "Hung Niang".

Awards
 Special Award : Outstanding Performance (2nd Golden Horse Awards) – Love Eterne (1963)
 Best Actress (11th Asian Film Festival, 1964) – Lady General Hua Mulan (1964)
 Most Versatile Talent(12th Asian Film Festival, 1965) – The Mermaid(1965)
 Best Actress (6th Golden Horse Awards, 30 October 68) – Too Late for Love (1966)
 Best Actress (20th Asian Film Festival, 15 June 74) – Father, Husband, Son
 Best Supporting Actress (Asian Film Festival) – Empress Dowager (1975)
 WIFTI-HK Professional Achievement Award (2006) presented during RR of 14 Amazons in HK.

Filmography

Titles & dates of release courtesy of Hong Kong Film Archive

RR = remastered and released on DVD
R = released without being remastered probably in the wrong aspect ratio

Amoy (Hokkien) Films
 Love of Young People – 1951
 Judge Bao Judges Yueying – 20 November 1955
 The Phoenix's Flirtation With Twin Dragons (Meng Lijun,The Sequel) – 25 November 1955
 Meng Jiangnu's Wail Shattered The Great Wall-6 July 1955
 Meng Lijun (A Reborn Love) – 26 August 1955
 The Cowherd and the Weaving Girl – 8 September 1955
 The Story of Third Madam Li – 12 May 1955
 Liang Shanbo & Zhu Yingtai – 3 August 1955
 Xuemei Teaches Her Son – 15 September 1955
 Chen Shimei Denies His Wife – 20 September 1955
 Love's Obligation – 13 April 1955
 Flower Terrace – 15 November 1956
 The Death of Daiyu (Back To Heaven) – 18 May 1956
 The Phoenix Returns Home – 6 June 1956
 Tiger Wang Snatches His Bride – 11 May 1956
 Lady Red-Broom – 11 February 1956
 Dream of the Red Chamber – 22 November 1956
 An'an Searches For His Mother – 20 December 1956
 Lianli Gives Birth To Han Qi – 22 May 1956
 Nazha Creates Havoc in the East Sea – 21 February 1956
 Wang Zhaojun – 26 April 1956
 Judge Bao's Night Trial of Guo Huai – 2 December 1956
 Madam Zhou Cheng in Search of Her Husband – 13 December 1956
 8 Immortals in Jiangnan(8 Immortals Cross The Sea) – 24 May 1957
 Monk Ji Gong – 4 April 1957
 Peach Blossom Weeps Blood – 6 June 1957
 Third Madam Teaches Her Son – 2 October 1957
 Xiaofeng – 5 November 1957
 Mulian Saves His Mother – 3 November 1957
 Love Mismatched – 14 February 1957
 Strange Tales of an Empty Chest – 6 May 1957
 Burning of Red Lotus Temple –  1 February 1957
 Meeting on the Magpies Bridge – 21 September 1957
 Burning of Red Lotus Temple, The Sequel – 2 February 1957
 True And False Romance – 12 October 1957
 The Battle Between Red Kid & Monkey King – 18 January 1957
 Xuemei Misses Her Husband – 26 February 1958
 Choosing A Son-In-Law – 17 September 1958
 Lu Mengzheng Wins The Bride's Embroidered Ball-8 May 1958
 Mr Wang Marries His Daughter To Hong Kong – 22 November 1958
 Hot Lady – 19 May 1958
 Discarded Body in a Bathroom – 7 August 1958
 Shrews From Afar – 5 June 1958
 Marry into Your Own Class – 4 April 1958
 Harmony Between The In-Laws – 3 July 1958
 Teddy Girls – 30 October 1958
 The True Story of Mazhu – 1 January 1958
 Crossroads – 24 September 1958
 Burning of Red Lotus Temple Part 3–14 January 1959
 Burning of Red Lotus Temple Part 4–17 January 1959
 Queen of Folk Songs – 17 April 1959
 Miss Jinfeng – 28 March 1959
 I Love Young Men – 17 June 1959
 Suffer for My Wife – 8 September 1959
 Brother Wang And Brother Liu – 1959
 Miss Singapore – 3 September 1959
 He Has Taken Her For Another – 4 September 1959
 Miss Cuicui – 7 February 1959
 Phony Phoenixes – 31 July 1959
 Mr Wang Throws A Birthday Party – 3 April 1959
 A Perfect Match – 11 March 1959
 Who Is Not Amorous? – 21 February 1959
 The Love of a Pedicab Driver – 16 January 1959
 Who Is The Murderer? – 16 April 1959
 A Girl in Love – 27 March 1959
 True Love –  14 January 1959
 The Maiden Catches The Culprit – 24 December 1959
 Mr Wang's New Year – 21 February 1959
 Liu Hai Meets Fairy – 1961
 Little Wild Cat (Xiao Ye Mao) – date of release unknown
 Long Feng Pei – date of release unknown
 Secret Swordswoman (Shen Mi Nu Xia) – date of release unknown
 Zai Jia Xin Niang – date of release unknown
 Fan Li Hua – date of release unknown

Cantonese Films
 Seven Daughters of Tsoi – 21 February 1962
 The Grandest of All Families – 13 February 1962
 The Little Happy Star – 9 February 1962
 Renegade (The Criminals) – 19 April 1963
 Cantonese Opera : Fu Gwai Wing Wah Tai Yat Ka (with Yam Kim Fai) – date of release unknown

Shaw Brothers Studio

Huangmei Opera Dubbings
 Dream of the Red Chamber – 2 August 1962 (RR-2004)
 Return of the Phoenix – 24 July 1963 (RR-2007)
 The Adulteress (Xiao Bai Cai) – 8 August 1963 (RR-2006)
 The Lotus Lamp – 8 July 1965 (RR – 2004)
 The Pearl Phoenix – 4 February 1967 (RR-2003)

Huangmei Opera Films
 Hung Niang – 1962 (not released -see last paragraph in biography)
 The Love Eterne – 3 April 1963 (RR – 2003)
 A Maid From Heaven (Seven Fairies) – 11 December 1963 (RR – 2004)
 Lady General Hua Mu-lan – 18 June 1964 (RR – 2004)
 The Crimson Palm – 28 October 1964 (RR-2007)
 The Female Prince – 10 December 1964 (RR – 2006)
 Inside The Forbidden City – 16 October 1965 (RR – 2003)
 The Grand Substitution – 15 April 1965 (RR – 2003)
 The Mermaid – 29 January 1965 (RR – 2005)
 The West Chamber – 10 October 1965 (RR – 2004)
 Dawn Will Come – 2 March 1966
 The Perfumed Arrow – 23 November 1966
 The Mirror and the Lichee – 9 November 1967 (RR – 2006)
 Forever And Ever – 20 January 1968
 The Three Smiles – 24 September 1969 (RR – 2003)

Wuxia/Martial Arts Films
 Temple of the Red Lotus – 1 October 1965 (RR – 2003)
 The Twin Swords – 1965 (RR – 2007 March)
 Sword and the Lute – 21 April 1967 (RR – 2006)
 Duel for Gold – 16 November 1971 (To be RR – Dec 2006)
 The Mighty One – 1972 (RR – July 2006)
 The Crimson Charm – 16 July 1971 (RR – 2005)
 The 14 Amazons – 27 July 1972 (RR – 2006)
 Finger of Doom – 14 April 1972 (RR – 2005)
 Flight Man (The Daredevil) – 1972
 Unarmed Combat – not completed in 1972

Contemporary Films
 Between Tears and Smiles – 18 January 1964 (RR – 2005)
 Vermilion Door – 26 August 1965 (RR – 2003)
 The Mating Season (Guest Star) – 1966
 Song of Tomorrow – 12 October 1967 (RR – 2005)
 Too Late For Love – 29 March 1967 (RR – 2003)
 Raw Passions – 4 September 1969 (RR – 2005)
 The Younger Generation – 12 March 1970 (RR – 2003)
 A Cause To Kill – 15 January 1970 (RR – 2004)
 The Silent Love – 2 April 1971 (RR – 2003)
 It's All in the Family – 1974 (RR – 2006)

Historical Drama Films
 Empress Dowager – 21 March 1975 (RR – 2003)
 The Last Tempest – 21 February 1976 (RR – 2003)

Post Shaw Brothers

Huangmei Opera Films & TV Productions
 Dream of the Red Chamber – 18 May 1978 (R on LD & VCD in 1993 ; OUT OF PRINT)
 The Imperious Princess (Jin hsi yu ye) – 25 July 1980 (R on LD & VCD in 1990 ; OUT OF PRINT)
 Imperial Matchmaker – 1982 (R on VCD in Malaysia by Zestbase)
 Butterfly Lovers 40 – 2002 [Stage] (RR in 2003)
 The Lute (Pi Pa Ji)- TV movie release date unknown (RR on DVD in Taiwan without English subs)

Notes:

1. The Dream of the Red Chamber and The Imperious Princess have been remastered by Warner Bros and screened on Celestial Channel. Both remastered prints are in the correct aspect ratio of 2.35:1 with English subtitles.

2. Imperial Matchmaker marked the only pairing on film of two famed male impersonators : Ivy Ling Po and Yang Lihua.

3. The Imperious Princess marked the final huangmei dubbing of Ivy Ling Po & Tsin Ting together on film. Tsin Ting is billed as Kwok Tsin Ting in the credits.

Wuxia/Martial Arts Films
 The Chinese Amazons(Women Soldiers) – 11 February 1975 (R on Tai Seng VHS in USA ; OUT OF PRINT)
 The Prominent Eunuch Chen Ho – 18 October 1977 (R on LD & VCD ; OUT OF PRINT)
 A Rescue From Hades (Mulian Saves His Mother) – release date unknown
 15 Female Warriors of the Sa Family – 1981
 Long Nuu Xin Fan (Dragon Girl Descends From Heaven) – 1982
 New Pilgrims to the West – 1986
 Liu Zhu Hui Nen Zuan (Legend of Liu Zhu Hui Nen Buddha) – 1987
 Golden Swallow – 16 December 1987 (RR – 2002)

Notes:

1. The Prominent Eunuch Chen Ho is retitled The Great Chase for the laserdisc and VCD release. Laser disc features an English soundtrack not on VCD.

2. Ivy Ling Po has cameos in both A Rescue From Hades & New Pilgrims to the West as Kuan Yin, the Goddess of Mercy.

3. A Rescue From Hades has been remastered in the correct aspect ratio of 2.35:1 with English subtitles and screened on Celestial channel.

4. 15 Female Warriors of the Sa Family reunites Ivy Ling Po with ex-Shaw stars Ching Li & Chiao Chiao. This movie also co-stars Kue Ya Lei as the eldest sister, Tang Lan Hua and Han Hsiang Chin. The villain is played by Chen Hsing.

Drama Films
 Father Husband Son – 1974
 Crossroad – 1976
 Mother – 1982 (R on Tai Seng VHS in USA dubbed in Cantonese)
 The Lost Generation (Feng shui er shi nien) – 1983

Notes:

Crossroad has been remastered by Warner Bros in the correct aspect ratio of 2.35:1 with English subtitles and screened on Celestial channel.

The Lost Generation grossed HK$1.548M and starred Chen Chen, Ivy Ling Po, Betty Ting Pei, Paul Chang Chung, Kwan Shan, Jenny Tseng, Chin Han (Ivy's husband), Yi Lei, Roy Chiao, Rosemund Kwan, Sibelle Hu, Kue Ya Lei, Chen Kuan Tai, Ke Chun Hsiung, Chin Han and Ching Miao among other stars. Written and directed by Liu Chia Chang.

Television
 Eight Thousand Li of Cloud and Moon
 7 Lives Becoming Couple (Qi Shi Fu Qi) – 16 April 1972
 Spring in Jiangnan – 1980
 Wu Tu Wu Ming – 1981
 Chang Lang Qi Tan – 1982
 Man Feng He Ming – 13 February 1983
 Qin Gui He Chu – 1984
 Fan Pu – 1986
 Ta Men De Gu Shi – 1986
 Jui Gan Pao Tiao Peng – 1986
 Jin Fen Wang Chao – 1986
 Qin Suo – 1986

References

External links
 
 Ivy Ling Po at hkmdb.com

1939 births
Living people
Hong Kong child singers
Hong Kong child actresses
Hong Kong film actresses
Canadian people of Chinese descent
Huangmei opera actresses
Shaw Brothers Studio
Actresses from Guangdong
People from Shantou
Singers from Guangdong
20th-century Hong Kong actresses
Chinese film actresses
Chinese television actresses
20th-century Chinese actresses
20th-century Chinese women singers
20th-century Hong Kong women singers
Male impersonators in Chinese opera
Pathé Records (Hong Kong) artists